Jiron Basumatary is an Indian politician and member of the Assam Legislative Assembly from Gossaigaon. Basumatary is member of the United People's Party Liberal. He won 2021 elections by elections for Gossaigaon after Majendra Narzary died of COVID-19 in 2021. Previously, he was member of the Bodoland Territorial Council from Jamduar constituency.

References 
5.  UPPL declares candidates for Gossaigaon and Tamulpur Guwahati Times.

6. 12 candidates file nominations for Assam bypolls Guwahati Times.

United People's Party Liberal politicians
Living people
People from Kokrajhar district
Assam MLAs 2021–2026
Year of birth missing (living people)